The black lounge suit (UK), stroller (U.S.), or Stresemann (Continental Europe), is a men's day attire semi-formal intermediate of a formal morning dress and an informal lounge suit; comprising grey striped or checked formal trousers, but distinguished by a conventional-length lounge jacket, single- or double-breasted in black, midnight blue or grey. This makes it largely identical to the formal morning dress from which it is derived, only having exchanged the morning coat with a suit jacket, yet with equivalent options otherwise, such as necktie or bowtie for neckwear, a waistcoat (typically black, grey, or buff), French cuffs dress shirt of optional collar type, and black dress shoes or dress boots. The correct hat would be a semi-formal homburg, bowler, or boater hat. Just as morning dress is considered the formal daytime equivalent of formal evening attire dress coat i e. white tie, so the stroller is considered the semi-formal daytime equivalent of the semi-formal evening attire dinner jacket, i.e. black tie (also called tuxedo). Unlike other dress codes, there is no clear equivalent for women, though typical morning dress and cocktail dress have both been identified as alternatives.

Wearing black lounge suit the traditional way with formal trousers largely fell out of use following the counterculture of the 1960s, although its practice has still been observed occasionally ever since.

For a semi-formal wedding day attire, the groom may dress in a dark-grey suit jacket with a dove-grey or buff waistcoat and optionally a wedding tie. For a semi-formal funeral day attire, the mourner may wear a matching black jacket and waistcoat presumably with black necktie.

Name
In British English it is called black lounge suit. Since black was reserved for formal wear, it was unknown as a colour for lounge suits, so the term was unambiguous. It has also been referred to as Marlborough suit in the U.K.

In American English the style is referred to as stroller suit, club coat or sack coat.

Around continental Europe, the style is often called a Stresemann after the German chancellor Gustav Stresemann (1878–1929) of the Weimar Republic, who wore the style as an alternative to morning coat.

It is also known as director's suit from the term inside director (especially in Japan), or citydress.

History

While early prototypes of black lounge suit did occur in the late 19th century, current form was settled on around 1900.

Stresemann famously wore the suit during the negotiations of the Locarno Treaties in 1925, and in Germany it became synonymous with him.

Winston Churchill is depicted in many photographs and paintings wearing a black lounge suit and striped formal trousers while serving as Prime Minister of the United Kingdom.

In the United Kingdom this mode of dress is now unusual, though the dress code sometimes does occur in fraternal orders such as Freemasonry for semi-formal daytime meetings. It is also still worn within the legal profession, especially by barristers. Indeed, the striped formal trouser are in some circles referred to as "barrister trousers".

The stroller's apparent decline in use, as opposed to the staying power of its evening counterpart the dinner jacket, could be attributed to several factors: daytime formality in general, and specifically the standard of changing clothes for various occasions, fell out of general use in post-World War II Western culture; and strollers were sometimes associated with uniformed servants, a concept which had also fallen out of favour. By the late 20th century, fictional characters in media depicted wearing strollers were often portrayed as self-important or inflexible snobs, often in opposition to more sympathetic characters dressed casually.

Traditionally, in Continental Europe and the British Commonwealth of Nations, morning dress is worn to formal day events, and white tie for formal evening events. However, when both dress codes declined in use in the United States, this also affected the use of the stroller.

Yet, notably, at his first inauguration in 1981, former U.S. President Ronald Reagan wore a black stroller. When his planned attire was announced it generated some controversy among D.C. lawmakers who thought they were being told to acquire such suits as well.

In media
Gentlemen's valets of the early 20th century are often depicted in television and film wearing black lounge suits as their standard apparel. In the 1964 Walt Disney film Mary Poppins (set in the 1910s), the character of Mr. Banks wears a black lounge suit to work every day at the bank. Thunderball (1965) of the James Bond films features a black lounge suit wedding. The Pan Tau children's television series (1969–1978) features a black lounge suit-wearing protagonist with the same name. In the long-running BBC sitcom Are You Being Served? (1972-1985), the character Captain Peacock always wore a stroller as the store's floorwalker. The character of John Bates of Downton Abbey (2010–2015) typically appears in a stroller while serving as his lord's valet. In the German neo-noir crime drama Babylon Berlin (2017-), set during the Weimar Republic, German Foreign Minister Gustav Stresemann wears a Stresemann suit accordingly.

Gallery

See also
 Suit
 Western dress codes

References

External links
 
 "Morning Dress," The Black Tie Guide, accessed 14 June 2012.
 "The Morning Dress Guide," Andrews & Pygott, accessed 21 October 2018.
 https://denvelklaedtemand.dk/kategori/festtoej/citydress

Suits (clothing)
Lounge jackets
Dress codes
19th-century fashion
20th-century fashion